Hyderabad Heroes was one of the eight teams that competed in the Indian Cricket League. The team was based in Hyderabad and its captain was former New Zealand player Chris Harris.

Coach
The inaugural coach for the Hyderabad Heroes was the former Pakistani wicketkeeper Moin Khan. Steve Rixon was coach of the team before the ICL's collapse.

Performance

References

Cricket in Telangana
Sport in Telangana
Indian Cricket League teams
Cricket clubs established in 2007
Cricket in Hyderabad, India
Former senior cricket clubs of India
2007 establishments in Andhra Pradesh